Romuald (c. 951–1027) was an Italian saint and the founder of the Camaldolese order.

Romuald may also refer to:

Romuald I of Benevento (d. 677), Italian noble, duke of Benevento, son of Grimoald
Romuald II of Benevento (d. 732), Italian noble, duke of Benevento, son of Gisulf I
Romuald (d. 787), eldest son and heir of Arechis II of Benevento
Romuald (cardinal) (d. 1136), Italian bishop and cardinal
Romuald Guarna (c. 1110–1182), Italian bishop and historian
Romuald Boco (b. 1985), French footballer
Romuald Bourque (1889–1974), Canadian businessman and politician
Romuald Figuier (b. 1941), French singer
Romuald Giegiel (b. 1957), Polish retired hurdler
Romuald Hazoumé (b. 1962), artist from the Republic of Bénin
Romuald Iodko (1894–1974), a Soviet sculptor
Romuald Jałbrzykowski (1876–1955), Polish Catholic Archbishop of Wilno (Vilnius)
Romuald Joubé (1876–1949), French stage and film actor
Romuald Muklevich (1890–1938), Commander-in-Chief of the Soviet Naval Forces from 1926 to 1931
Romuald Peiser (b. 1979), French football goalkeeper
Romuald Spasowski (1920–1995), Polish communist and ambassador to the United States, best known for defecting in 1981
Romuald Traugutt (1826–1864), Polish general

French masculine given names
Polish masculine given names
Germanic given names

de:Romuald (Vorname)